Fontjoncouse is a commune in the Aude department in southern France.

Fontjoncouse has gained a reputation in the culinary world, as it is the location of Gilles Goujon's three-Michelin starred restaurant, L'Auberge du Vieux Puits.

Population

See also
 Corbières AOC
 Communes of the Aude department

References

Communes of Aude
Aude communes articles needing translation from French Wikipedia